Sir Hugh Dillon Massy, 1st Baronet (1740 – 29 April 1807) was an Anglo-Irish politician and baronet.

Massy was the son of the Very Reverend Charles Massy, Dean of Limerick and Ardfert. He was first elected to the Irish House of Commons as the Member of Parliament for Limerick City in May 1761, but was not returned for the seat in the second vote of that year. He stood in Clare in 1776, but was declared "not duly elected" and replaced by Sir Lucius O'Brien, 3rd Baronet. On 9 March 1782, Massy was made a Baronet, of Donass in the County of Clare, in the Baronetage of Ireland. He was elected as the MP for Clare in 1783 and held the seat until 1790.

Marriage
He married Elizabeth Stacpoole, daughter of George John Baptista Stacpoole and Mary Massy, on 16 August 1766. He was a first cousin of Hugh Massy, 1st Baron Massy and Eyre Massey, 1st Baron Clarina.

References

Year of birth unknown
1807 deaths
18th-century Anglo-Irish people
Baronets in the Baronetage of Ireland
Irish MPs 1761–1768
Irish MPs 1783–1790
Members of the Parliament of Ireland (pre-1801) for County Limerick constituencies
Members of the Parliament of Ireland (pre-1801) for County Clare constituencies
Year of birth uncertain